Palemia Sialesa Lilomaiava (born in Lepea, on 23 March 1960) is a Samoan rugby union player. He plays as a prop. He is a relative of the fellow rugby union player Robert Lilomaiava.

Career
He was called up for the Samoan team in the 1991 Rugby World Cup, although he never played any game. His first and last international match was against New Zealand at the Eden Park on 31 July 1993.

Notes

External links
 Palamia Lilomaiava international statistics

1960 births
Living people
Samoan rugby union players
Rugby union props
Samoa international rugby union players